The 1965 Segunda División de Chile was the 14th season of the Segunda División de Chile.

Ferrobádminton was the tournament's champion.

Table

See also
Chilean football league system

References

External links
 RSSSF 1965

Segunda División de Chile (1952–1995) seasons
Primera B
Chil